Nemcovce may refer to several places in Slovakia notably in the Prešov Region.

Nemcovce, Bardejov District
Nemcovce, Prešov District